Glen Robinson  (born 2 November 1984 in Newcastle-Upon-Tyne, England) is an English Actor, Director, Musician and Broadcaster.

Career
Joseph trained at the Guildford School of Acting, graduating with first class honours in 2007. He won the Sir John Gielgud Award for Musical Theatre in 2008.

Joseph spent the majority of his Acting career touring the World playing the  titular role of Buddy Holly in Buddy – The Buddy Holly Story. as well as playing the role in the revival of the show in London’s West End.

Wrestling
Joseph was one of three owners of PROGRESS Wrestling, a professional wrestling company based in London. He was also the lead commentator for the company, and Executive Producer. The company was formed by Jim Smallman and Jon Briley in March 2012, with Joseph joining them in May of that year. In 2020, Joseph and co-owner Smallman stepped away from the company to focus on their expanding roles at WWE .

Joseph works for WWE as a producer and as part of the European Talent Development team for their NXT UK brand.

Music
In 2014 Joseph released his debut EP, Under Nashville Skies, which reached the top ten of the iTunes country music chart upon its release.

Filmography

Theater

Film

References

External links
 Official website

Living people
Male actors from Newcastle upon Tyne
Professional wrestling executives
Professional wrestling promoters
Professional wrestling announcers
1984 births
Progress Wrestling